This is a list of notable painters from, or associated with, Cyprus.

A
 Ruzen Atakan (born 1966)

G
 İsmet Güney (1932–2009)

H
 Xanthos Hadjisoteriou (1920–2003)
 Mustafa Hulusi (born 1971)

K
 Telemachos Kanthos (1910–1993)

L
 Marios Loizides (1928–1988)

M
 Niki Marangou (1948–2013)

N
 Nicos Nicolaides (1884–1956)

P
 Stass Paraskos (1933–2014)

S
 Konstantia Sofokleous (born 1974)
 Arestís Stasí (1940–2013)

V
 Stelios Votsis (1929–2012)

References

Cypriot painters
Cypriot
Painters